Harrison "Harry" Shipp (born November 7, 1991) is a former American soccer player who last played as a midfielder for Seattle Sounders FC of Major League Soccer.

Early life and college
Shipp was born in Lake Forest, Illinois, and attended Lake Forest High School. He played club soccer for the official youth soccer club of the Chicago Fire, The Chicago Fire Juniors North. Following high school, Shipp attended the University of Notre Dame and played four seasons there, scoring 23 goals and tallying 24 assists in 83 matches. He finished his collegiate career by helping lead Notre Dame to their first ever NCAA College Cup appearance and victory. Following the 2013 season, he was nominated for the prestigious MAC-Hermann Trophy, but eventually lost out to University of Maryland striker Patrick Mullins. Shipp did, however, win the 2013 Atlantic Coast Conference Men's Soccer Offensive Player of the Year award.

Club career 
Throughout Notre Dame's college cup run, there was much discussion whether Shipp would be eligible for the MLS Superdraft, or could be signed to a homegrown contract by the Chicago Fire. After the Fire made a homegrown claim for his signature, some MLS clubs requested for the league to verify whether he was classified as a homegrown talent. After MLS confirmed his status as a homegrown player, the Fire signed Shipp to a homegrown deal, making him the third in the club's history after Victor Pineda and Kellen Gulley. He made his first appearance for Chicago by playing the full 90 minutes in an away match against Portland Timbers on March 16, 2014. On May 11, 2014, Shipp scored his first goal and his first professional hat trick for the Fire in a 5–4 away victory at New York Red Bulls. On June 7, 2014, Shipp scored two goals at Toyota Park in a losing effort against Seattle Sounders FC in which the final score was 3–2.

On February 13, 2016, Shipp was traded to Montreal Impact for general allocation and targeted allocation money.

On December 22, 2016, Montreal traded Shipp to newly crowned MLS Cup champion Seattle Sounders FC in exchange for allocation money. Shipp made his Sounders debut on March 11, 2017, when he started against his former team in a 2–2 draw against Montreal. Shipp scored his first Sounders goal in a 3–1 win over New York on March 19, 2017, redirecting a shot by Joevin Jones into the goal. On June 16, 2020, Shipp announced his retirement from professional soccer to pursue an MBA at Northwestern University's Kellogg School of Management.

Career statistics

Honors

Club 
Seattle Sounders FC
 MLS Cup: 2019

Individual 
 NCAA Division I Championship 2013
 ACC Offensive Player of the Year 2013
 First team All-America selection
 Finalist for both the MAC Hermann Trophy and the Senior CLASS Award
 Most Outstanding Offensive Player at the NCAA Championship  
 Capital One Academic All-American of the Year for Men's Soccer 
 NSCAA Scholar-All-America Player of the Year 
 ACC Men's Scholar-Athlete of the Year award

Family and personal life

Shipp is the oldest of four children born to his parents, Terry and Kathleen. His younger brother, Michael, played soccer with him at Notre Dame. At the end of 2016, Shipp proposed to his long-time girlfriend Maria Kosse, whom he met while at Notre Dame.

References

External links 

 Notre Dame Player Profile

1991 births
Living people
All-American men's college soccer players
American soccer players
Association football forwards
Chicago Fire FC players
Chicago Fire U-23 players
Homegrown Players (MLS)
Major League Soccer players
CF Montréal players
NCAA Division I Men's Soccer Tournament Most Outstanding Player winners
Notre Dame Fighting Irish men's soccer players
Seattle Sounders FC players
Tacoma Defiance players
Soccer players from Illinois
Sportspeople from Lake Forest, Illinois
USL Championship players
USL League Two players